The Red Men Hall, also known as the Redmen Wigwam, was a meeting hall in Index, Washington originally for the Improved Order of Red Men.  The building, which was listed on the National Register of Historic Places in 1973, collapsed on New Year's Day 2009.

Organization 
The Red Men are a fraternal lodge which imitate Native American traditions and call their local lodges "wigwams".  The Index Tribe #68 of the Great Council of Washington constructed the building in 1903 which included a stage and kitchen.  The building was the largest structure in the small logging and mining town and served as a center of social activities including vaudeville shows, weddings, and political gatherings.

Building 
The building was a two-story wood-frame structure built with local lumber a narrow, country-store style with an arched roof and a false front. A bracket-supported slope-roofed porch spanned the entire front of the building.  Despite several efforts at restoration, the building was long since abandoned by January 1, 2009 when it collapsed from the weight of the snow from a major storm in the high elevation. No trace remains of the building today.

See also
 Red Men Hall, for other buildings with the name in the United States
 National Register of Historic Places listings in Snohomish County, Washington

References

External links 

 

Improved Order of Red Men
Clubhouses on the National Register of Historic Places in Washington (state)
Buildings and structures in Snohomish County, Washington
Collapsed buildings in the United States
Cultural infrastructure completed in 1903
National Register of Historic Places in Snohomish County, Washington
Western false front architecture